Ana Galán (born 3 September 1964) is a Spanish writer now living in the United States. Writing in both Spanish and English, she is essentially a children's writer but also writes humorous books for adults.

Born in Oviedo, Spain, since 2002 Galán has been working for the US company Scholastic Books where she has published 25 works.

References

External links
Ana Galán's website

Spanish children's writers
Spanish women children's writers
Living people
People from Oviedo
1964 births
20th-century Spanish women writers